Retribution is an 1818 British tragedy by the writer John Dillon. It premiered at the Theatre Royal, Covent Garden in London on 1 January 1818. The original London cast included Charles Mayne Young as Veranes, King of Persia, William Macready as Chosroo, Charles Kemble as Hamed, Daniel Egerton as Abdas, William Abbot as Hafiz, Daniel Terry as Suthes, Charles Connor as Sohrab and Elizabeth O'Neill as Zimra.

References

Bibliography
 Greene, John C. Theatre in Dublin, 1745-1820: A Calendar of Performances, Volume 6. Lexington Books, 2011.
 Nicoll, Allardyce. A History of Early Nineteenth Century Drama 1800-1850. Cambridge University Press, 1930.

1818 plays
West End plays
British plays
Tragedy plays